Sanguiyeh may refer to:
 Sanguiyeh, Jiroft
 Sanguiyeh, Rabor